Bally Sports Southwest is a Texan regional sports network owned by Diamond Sports Group (a joint-venture between Sinclair Broadcast Group and Entertainment Studios), and operates as an affiliate of Bally Sports. The channel broadcasts regional coverage of professional, collegiate and high school sports events throughout the South Central United States. The network is headquartered in the Dallas-Fort Worth suburb of Irving, Texas, with master control hubbed at Bally Sports Networks' operations center in Atlanta, which houses master control operations for its regional networks in the Southeastern United States.

Bally Sports Southwest is available on cable providers throughout much of Texas, Arkansas, Louisiana, and New Mexico; it is also available nationwide on satellite via DirecTV.

History

Bally Sports Southwest originally launched on January 4, 1983, as Home Sports Entertainment (HSE), a unit of Warner-Amex Cable. As one of the first regional sports networks in North America, it served as the cable television home of professional and collegiate sports teams throughout Texas and surrounding states. In 1988, HSE became an affiliate of Prime Sports Networks.

Like many Prime Sports-affiliated networks, it shared channel space with other networks on several cable providers in its service area (most often resulting in its programming being restricted to nighttime periods) until the early 1990s, when cable systems began upgrading their headend infrastructures to increase channel capacity, reassigning most of the cable channels that shared time with HSE to other channel slots once these upgrades were complete. In 1994, Liberty Media acquired HSE, converting it into an owned-and-operated affiliate of Prime Sports and changing its name to Prime Sports Southwest.

In 1996, News Corporation, which formed its own sports division for the Fox network two years earlier, acquired a 50% interest in the Prime Network from Liberty Media; the network was officially rebranded as Fox Sports Southwest on November 1 of that year, as part of a relaunch of the Prime Network affiliates as the cornerstones of the new Fox Sports Net. The channel was then rebranded as Fox Sports Net Southwest in 2000, as part of a collective brand modification of the FSN networks under the "Fox Sports Net" banner.

In 2004, the channel shortened its name to FSN Southwest, through the networks' de-emphasis of the brand, before reverting to the Fox Sports Southwest moniker in 2008. In 2007, a high definition simulcast feed of Fox Sports Southwest, which broadcasts in the 720p format was launched. Initially, the channel did not provide a 24-hour simulcast but it broadcast various Mavericks, Rangers, Spurs and Stars games, as well as several NCAA football and basketball games shown nationally on FSN and other programming distributed nationally by Fox Sports Networks in high definition. Today, nearly all programming is shown in HD. In July 2013, News Corporation spun off the Fox Sports Networks and most of its other U.S. entertainment properties into 21st Century Fox.

On December 14, 2017, as part of a merger between both companies, The Walt Disney Company announced plans to acquire all 22 regional Fox Sports networks from 21st Century Fox, including Fox Sports Southwest. However, on June 27, 2018, the Justice Department ordered their divestment under antitrust grounds, citing Disney's ownership of ESPN (ESPN also owns a stake in the Longhorn Network). On May 3, 2019, Sinclair Broadcast Group and Entertainment Studios (through their joint venture, Diamond Holdings) bought Fox Sports Networks from The Walt Disney Company for $10.6 billion. The deal closed on August 22, 2019, thus placing Fox Sports Southwest in common ownership with 17 Sinclair stations in Texas. On November 17, 2020, Sinclair announced an agreement with casino operator Bally's Corporation to serve as a new naming rights partner for the FSN channels. Sinclair announced the new Bally Sports branding for the channels on January 27, 2021.  On March 31, 2021, coinciding with the 2021 Major League Baseball season, Fox Sports Southwest was rebranded as Bally Sports Southwest, resulting in 18 other Regional Sports Networks renamed Bally Sports in their respective regions.

On March 14, 2023, Diamond Sports filed for Chapter 11 Bankruptcy.

Programming
Bally Sports Southwest holds the exclusive regional cable television rights to the Dallas Mavericks and San Antonio Spurs of the NBA, the Dallas Stars of the NHL, and the Texas Rangers of Major League Baseball. In addition, the channel also provides regional coverage of collegiate sporting events from the Big 12 Conference and Conference USA, as well as the cable rights to the University Interscholastic League, carrying its Class 6A high school state championship games for football, boys' and girls' basketball, baseball and softball, and the 2A-5A high school football championships. Prior to their move to Las Vegas, Fox Sports Southwest had the rights to the San Antonio Stars of the WNBA. Prior to their move to Henderson, Fox Sports Southwest also carried select games from the San Antonio Rampage of the AHL.

A mix of programs originally supplied by Bally Sports and some original programming exclusive to Bally Sports Southwest (such as High School Spotlight, ″High School Scoreboard Live″ and the Dallas Morning News-co-produced SportsdayOnAir) are also broadcast.

Coverage areas
Bally Sports Southwest has the second-largest market area and total viewer reach of any network in the Bally Sports regional networks group (behind Bally Sports South). Its expansive footprint extends from eastern New Mexico to Panama City, Florida. The network is divided into four broadcasting zones, each representing the five largest television markets in its designated broadcast region:  
 Dallas-Fort Worth (including northern and north-central Texas, parts of West Texas, parts of East Texas, and northern Louisiana) 
 Houston (southeast Texas, within the former coverage area of the defunct sub-feed Fox Sports Houston)
 San Antonio (including Austin, El Paso, southern Texas, and parts of West Texas and eastern New Mexico)
 Arkansas

The separation of broadcast zones for the channel is mostly due to the defined broadcast territories set by the National Basketball Association for four of the region's five NBA franchises – the Dallas Mavericks, Oklahoma City Thunder, San Antonio Spurs and New Orleans Pelicans (the Houston Rockets are carried on AT&T SportsNet Southwest). In the event of a scheduling conflict between either of the teams (such as Mavericks/Thunder, Mavericks/Spurs, Thunder/Spurs, and sometimes Mavericks/Spurs/Thunder), the games will be shown on their own subfeeds (Thunder on Bally Sports Oklahoma, Spurs or Mavericks on Bally Sports Southwest). In certain circumstances, games involving the Dallas Stars (the only National Hockey League team based in Texas) air on Bally Sports Southwest beyond the Dallas-Fort Worth designated market area, including the Houston market, which no longer receives any NBA broadcasts over Bally Sports Southwest.

Other services

Bally Sports Southwest Extra
Bally Sports Southwest Extra (previously branded as "Bally Sports Southwest Plus") is an alternate channel feed of Bally Sports Southwest used to broadcast select events from teams to which Bally Sports Southwest holds the broadcast rights within the designated market in the event that two or more games scheduled to be broadcast on the channel are held simultaneously, requiring the overflow feed to carry games that cannot air on the main feed.

Bally Sports Southwest streaming options 
Bally Sports Southwest is not available on streaming services such as fubotv, Sling, YouTubeTV, or Hulu + live TV, though it is still available on DirecTV Stream only on the Choice package and above.

References

External links

FC Dallas
Television channels and stations established in 1983
Companies that filed for Chapter 11 bankruptcy in 2023
1983 establishments in Texas
Texas Rangers (baseball)
Dallas Mavericks
Dallas Stars
San Antonio Spurs
Bally Sports